The 2009 Boucherville municipal election was an election that was held on the 1st of November 2009 to elect Boucherville's mayor and eight councillors.

Jean Martel and his party's eight candidates were elected. The voter turnout was 49.8%.

The election results were made available on the website of Québec's Ministry of Municipal Affairs and Housing.

Election Results

Mayor

 The incumbent mayor did not run.

District 1 (Marie-Victorin) Councillor

District 2 (Rivière-aux-Pins) Councillor

District 3 (Des Découvreurs) Councillor

District 4 (Harmonie) Councillor

District 5 (La Seigneurie) Councillor

District 6 (Saint-Louis) Councillor

 The incumbent did not run.

District 7 (De Normandie) Councillor

 The incumbent did not run.

District 8 (Du Boisé) Councillor

 The incumbent did not run.

References

Boucherville
Boucherville
2009